Ivey League was a poker training website founded by American professional poker player Phil Ivey. Ivey League launched on January 28, 2014 offering poker strategy videos from prominent professional players serving as coaches. The roster of Ivey League instructors included Ivey, Jennifer Harman, Cole South and Patrik Antonius, among others. There are three membership tiers available for varying skill levels. Training videos covered Texas hold'em in addition to many other poker variants and topics.

History 
LeggoPoker.com officially launched in November 17, 2007. Users received access to online forums, videos from pros, individual and group coaching, and information on poker rakeback.  The site employed a roster of well-known and successful online pros to act as coaches, including Aaron "aejones" Jones, Peter "Apathy" Jetten and Andrew "luckychewy" Lichtenberger. Co-owners Brooks and Tickner took a hands-on approach to operating Leggo Poker. Brooks served as a coach on the site, while Tickner was in charge of web development.  In October 2009, lead video producer Aaron Jones purchased the site from Greg Brooks.

In February 2013, Phil Ivey announced the acquisition of Leggo Poker with the intention of converting the training site into Ivey League. Leggo Poker's team of instructors, including former owner and lead video producer Aaron Jones, transitioned to the new website.

In April 2017, Ivey league announced it would no longer post new video content.

References

External links 
 

Defunct poker companies
Internet properties established in 2007
Internet properties disestablished in 2017
Gambling companies established in 2007
Gambling companies disestablished in 2017